Ryan Walker Longwell (born August 16, 1974), is a former American football placekicker. After playing college football for the California Golden Bears, he started his professional football career with the San Francisco 49ers, but never played a game for the franchise. He then played for the Green Bay Packers from 1997 to 2005. He played for the Minnesota Vikings from 2006 to 2011. He also played briefly for the Seattle Seahawks during the 2012 playoffs.

Early years
Longwell attended high school in Bend, Oregon, where he played high school football for Bend High School's Lava Bears. A three-year letter winner in football as a kicker, Longwell also was the team's backup quarterback. He also played baseball as a third baseman, earning three letters in that sport. He earned all-conference honors in both sports.

In 1993, he started college at the University of California, Berkeley where he played football and earned four varsity letters. At California he served as both a punter and placekicker for the team, earning all-conference honors in the Pac-10 his senior year as a punter and second team honors as a kicker. Longwell graduated with a Bachelor of Arts degree in English.

Professional football

Green Bay Packers
Longwell was acquired by the Green Bay Packers off waivers from the San Francisco 49ers in 1997. With the Packers, Longwell played in Super Bowl XXXII, where he kicked one field goal and three extra points in their 31-24 loss to the Denver Broncos.  He spent his first 9 seasons playing for the Packers, and scored over 120 points during 6 of those seasons.  By the end of his 7th season in Green Bay, Longwell had passed Hall of Famer Don Hutson to become the Packers all-time leading scorer.  And while Mason Crosby has since passed him, Longwell remains second on Green Bay’s all-time scoring list.

Minnesota Vikings
Longwell signed a free agent contract with the Vikings in the 2006 offseason. In his second game with the Minnesota Vikings, Longwell had one of the best performances of his career.  He was responsible for all 16 of the Vikings points in a 16-13 win over the Carolina Panthers, kicking three field goals (including the game-winning field goal in overtime) and throwing a 16-yard touchdown pass on a fake field goal play in the fourth quarter. In the 2008 season finale against the New York Giants, he kicked a 50-yard field goal as time expired to help the Vikings clinch the division in a 20-19 victory.

During the 2010 offseason, Longwell, a close friend of Brett Favre, became a sort of unofficial spokesman for Favre, as the media frequently questioned him on whether Favre would return to the Vikings or retire.  When Longwell picked Favre up at the airport in Minnesota on August 17, 2010, TV station helicopters followed Longwell's SUV all the way to Vikings headquarters.

Seattle Seahawks and retirement
On January 8, 2013, Longwell was signed by the Seattle Seahawks after Steven Hauschka suffered a calf injury. On August 12, 2013, the Green Bay Packers announced that Longwell would retire as a Packer.

Records
 Second leading scorer in Green Bay Packers history with 1054 points.
 Has the second-most field goals in Green Bay Packers history with 226.
 Kicked third-longest field goal in Green Bay Packers history (54 yards - tied with Chris Jacke and Dave Rayner)
 Second most points by a player who never made a pro bowl (1,687) (Mason Crosby - 1,806).

Career regular season statistics
Career high/best bolded

Family
Longwell is the cousin of 1992 and 1996 Olympic athlete Michael Orr. He is married to Sarah Longwell, and they have two children, Shaye and Reece.

See also
 List of most consecutive starts and games played by National Football League players

References

External links
Ryan Longwell at NFL.com

1974 births
Living people
Players of American football from Seattle
Sportspeople from Bend, Oregon
American football placekickers
California Golden Bears football players
San Francisco 49ers players
Green Bay Packers players
Minnesota Vikings players
Seattle Seahawks players